Polyscias pulgarensis, synonym Arthrophyllum pulgarense, is a species of plant in the family Araliaceae. It is endemic to the Philippines.

References

Flora of the Philippines
pulgarensis
Vulnerable plants
Taxonomy articles created by Polbot